The Franchise 500 is an annual ranking of the top 500 franchising companies in the U.S. and Canada, compiled by Entrepreneur magazine through a submission and review process. The ranking is based on an evaluation of each company's costs and fees, size and growth, franchisee support, brand strength, and financial strength and stability. The list includes both public and privately held companies, and has been published annually since 1980.

Qualifications 
Each company that applies for the Franchise 500 through the online submission form is required to submit a copy of its current Franchise Disclosure Document and other supporting documents in order to verify the information submitted. All qualifying applicants are scored by Entrepreneur's proprietary formula, which evaluates franchise companies based on more than 150 data points across five pillars: costs and fees, size and growth, support, financial strength and stability, and brand strength. The 500 top-scoring companies become the Franchise 500. Entrepreneur typically receives more than 1,000 applications for the ranking annually.

In addition to the main Franchise 500 ranking, Entrepreneur uses the data provided through the Franchise 500 applications to create additional smaller rankings and lists that are published throughout the year, including "Fastest-Growing Franchises," "Top New & Emerging Franchises," "Top Low-Cost Franchises," "Top Global Franchises," "Best of the Best", "Top Franchises for Veterans", "Top Homebased/Mobile Franchises" and "Top Food Franchises."

Rankings 
 Franchise 500 - Overall ranking of the most successful franchise companies of the year.

Additional 
 Fastest-Growing Franchises - The fastest-growing franchise companies based on systemwide unit growth over one year
Top New & Emerging Franchises - The top companies that have been franchising for five years or less
Top Low-Cost Franchises - The top franchises that can be started for less than $50,000, less than $100,000, and less than $150,000
Top Global Franchises - The top franchises expanding outside the U.S.
Best of the Best - The #1 franchise from each category of the Franchise 500 ranking
 Top Franchises for Veterans - The top franchises offering startup incentives for veterans
Top Homebased/Mobile Franchises - The top franchises that can be run from home and/or from a mobile unit (with no need for outside office, retail, or warehouse space)
Top Food Franchises - The top restaurant and retail food franchise opportunities

2022 list 
In 2022, the ten companies that ranked at the top of the 500 were:

See also 

 List of franchises

References 

Annual magazines published in the United States
Lists of magazines
Corporation-related lists 
Top lists